Asalebria florella is a species of snout moth in the genus Asalebria. It was described by Josef Johann Mann in 1862. It is found in Spain, Portugal, France, Italy, Germany, Croatia, North Macedonia, Greece, Bulgaria, Romania, Ukraine, Russia and Turkey.

References

Moths described in 1862
Phycitini
Moths of Europe
Moths of Asia